Sac City may refer to:
 Sac City, Iowa
 Sacramento City College
 City of Sacramento

See also
Sacramento City (disambiguation)